Major General Deshamanya Asoka Kanthilal Jayawardena, RWP, RSP, VSV, USP, was Sri Lankan senior army officer and politician. He was the former Provincial Governor of the Governor of North Eastern Province and Secretary to the Minister of Defence.

Military career
Jayawardena was Overall Operational Commander (OOC) of the Sri Lanka Army. In 1997 he was succeeded by Lt. Gen. Srilal Weerasooriya. Jayawardena also served as Security Forces Commander in Jaffna.

Political career
Retiring from the Sri Lanka Army in 1998, Jayawardena was appointed as Governor of North Eastern Province. His predecessor Gamini Fonseka resigned from the office due to a difference of opinion with the President at the time. He is known to be a close confidant of the President Chandrika Kumaratunga, and he is believed to be one of her principal military advisors.

Jayawardena was the first governor of the province to visit the Jaffna peninsula after the establishment of the North Eastern Provincial Council.

Awards
His awards and decorations include the Medals; Rana Wickrama Padakkama (RWP), Rana Sura Padakkama (RSP), Vishista Seva Vibhushanaya (VSV) and Uttama Seva Padakkama (USP).

In 2005 he was awarded the National title, Deshamanya.

Sri Lankan awards
In Order of Precedence
   Rana Wickrama Padakkama
   Rana Sura Padakkama
   Vishista Seva Vibhushanaya
   Uttama Seva Padakkama

References

External links

Governors of the Northern Provincial Council - History of Governors
Sri Lankan Provinces from 1988 

|-

|-

Living people
Governors of North Eastern Province, Sri Lanka
Sri Lankan major generals
Sinhalese military personnel
Members of the Sabaragamuwa Provincial Council
Chief Ministers of Sabaragamuwa Province
Year of birth missing (living people)
Alumni of S. Thomas' College, Mount Lavinia